In mathematical group theory, the Hall–Higman theorem, due to , describes the possibilities for the minimal polynomial of an element of prime power order for a representation of a p-solvable group.

Statement

Suppose that G is a p-solvable group with no normal p-subgroups, acting faithfully on a vector space over a field of characteristic p. 
If x is an element of order pn of G then the minimal polynomial is of the form (X − 1)r for some r ≤ pn. The Hall–Higman theorem states that one of the following 3 possibilities holds:
r = pn
p is a Fermat prime and the Sylow 2-subgroups of G are non-abelian and r ≥ pn −pn−1
p = 2 and the Sylow q-subgroups of G are non-abelian for some Mersenne prime q = 2m − 1 less than 2n and r ≥ 2n − 2n−m.

Examples
The group SL2(F3) is 3-solvable (in fact solvable) and has an obvious 2-dimensional representation over a field of characteristic p=3, in which the elements of order 3 have minimal polynomial (X−1)2 with r=3−1.

References

Theorems in group theory
Number theory